Enrique Meyer Soto Airport  is an airport serving Caleta Tortel, a Pacific coastal village in the Aysén Region of Chile.

The runway is on the opposite side of a hill north of the village. There is mountainous terrain in all quadrants.

See also

Transport in Chile
List of airports in Chile

References

External links
OpenStreetMap - Caleta Tortel
OurAirports - Enrique Meyer Soto Airport
SkyVector - Enrique Meyer S Airport

Airports in Aysén Region